The Athletics competition at the 2014 Central American and Caribbean Games was held in Veracruz, Mexico.

The tournament was held from 23–30 November at the Heriberto Jara Corona Stadium.
Detailed reports and an appraisal of the results were given.

Medal summary

Men's events

Women's events

Medal table

Participation
According to an unofficial count, 417 athletes from 31 countries participated in the event.

 (2)
 (1)
 (11)
 (4)
 (2)
 (2)
 (2)
 (3)
 (43)
 (15)
 (65)
 (3)
 (23)
 (4)
 (4)
 (13)
 (4)
 (10)
 (2)
 (15)
 (82)
 (5)
 (10)
 (17)
 (8)
 (3)
 (6)
 (3)
 (11)
 (10)
 (34)

References

External links
Official Website

2014
Central American and Caribbean Games
2014 Central American and Caribbean Games events
2014 CAC Games